Athol Compton (born 1951) was an Aboriginal Australian actor. He became internationally famous when cast in The Games (1970).

Select credits
Skippy episode "The Rainmakers"
The Games (1970)
Delta episode "Blackout"(1970)
Homicide episode "Flash Johnny" (1970)
Pig in a Poke episode "Ray's Story" (1977)
The Last Wave (1977)
The Timeless Land (1980)
A Country Practice (1984) episodes 1 & 2 "An Axe to Grind"
Short Changed (1986)
BabaKiueria (1986)
Flight into Hell (1987)

References

External links
Athol Compton at IMDb
Athol Compton at Ausstage

Australian actors
1951 births
Living people

Aboriginal cinema in Australia